This is a list of utilities for creating a live USB. Only those listed on Wikipedia are included.

Overview

 "Multiboot" means that the tool allows multiple systems on the USB stick, as well as a bootloader on the USB flash drive to choose which system to load at boot time. Multiboot is environmental technology since it requires only a single storage device to boot multiple files.
 "Persistence" is the ability, for a Linux Live distribution, to save the changes (like softwares, documents, parameters, etc) in the live USB across reboots.

See also 
 List of Linux distributions that run from RAM
 Multiboot specification
 System installer

References

Lists of software

ru:Live USB#Список инструментов для создания систем Live USB